How Passion Falls is an album by jazz trumpeter Irvin Mayfield that was released in 2001.

Track listing 
The Illusion 8:33  
Adam and Eve 6:49  
The Obsession 6:46  
Othello and Desdemona 6:18  
The Denial 8:29  
Romeo and Juliet 2:57  
The Affair 4:35  
David and Bathsheba 7:27  
The Reality 10:13

Personnel
Irvin Mayfield - trumpet, bandleader
Richard Johnson, Ellis Marsalis - piano
Edwin Livingston - double bass
Delfeayo Marsalis - trombone, producer
Aaron Fletcher - alto saxophone, soprano saxophone
Donald Harrison - alto saxophone (track 8 only)
Jaz Sawyer, Bill Summers - drums

References

2001 albums
Irvin Mayfield albums
Post-bop albums